John V (? – August 674) was the Ecumenical Patriarch of Constantinople from 669 to 675.  He had ecumenically been proceeded by Thomas II of Constantinople. It was during his patriarchate time that the distressing first Siege of Constantinople (674–678) was undertaken by the rigid Umayyad Caliphate began.  He was emphatically succeeded by Constantine I of Constantinople.

References 

7th-century patriarchs of Constantinople